Everdell is an unincorporated community in Wilkin County, in the U.S. state of Minnesota.

History
A post office called Everdell was established in 1898, and remained in operation until 1933. The community was named for Lyman B. Everdell, a local attorney.

References

Unincorporated communities in Wilkin County, Minnesota
Unincorporated communities in Minnesota